The 2015 Pan American Games medal table is a list of National Olympic Committees (NOCs) ranked by the number of gold medals won by their athletes during the 2015 Pan American Games, held in Toronto, Canada from July 10 to 26, 2015. Approximately 6,132 athletes from 41 NOCs participated in 364 events in 36 sports and 51 disciplines.

The United States led the medal table both in number of gold medals won (103), and in overall medals (265). Behind the United States, Canada was second on the medal table by golds (78), and second by overall medals (219) – their best result ever, while Brazil was third by golds (42), and third by overall medals (141). For first time since 1971, Cuba finished outside top-2, leading to a 4th place.

High jumper Levern Spencer won St. Lucia's first Pan American gold medal.

Medal table

The ranking in this table is based on information provided by the Pan American Sports Organization (PASO) and is consistent with PASO convention in its published medal tables. By default, the table is ordered by the number of gold medals the athletes from a nation have won (in this context, a "nation" is an entity represented by a National Olympic Committee). The number of silver medals is taken into consideration next and then the number of bronze medals. If nations are still tied, equal ranking is given and they are listed alphabetically by IOC country code.

In badminton, boxing, judo, karate, racquetball, squash, taekwondo, table tennis, and wrestling two bronze medals will be awarded for each event. Also in bowling, fencing and squash two bronze medals will be awarded in some events. Therefore, the total number of bronze medals will be greater than the total number of gold or silver medals.

Two gold medals, one to the United States and one to Colombia, were awarded for a first-place tie in the men's pommel horse. Two gold medals were also awarded for a first-place tie in the men's coxless pair, one to Chile and one to Argentina. No silver medal was awarded for both events. Two bronze medals were awarded for a third-place tie at the men's K2 200m, one to Brazil and one to Canada.

Eleven NOC's did not win medals: Aruba, Belize, British Virgin Islands, Cayman Islands, Dominica, Guyana, Haiti, Nicaragua, Suriname and the Virgin Islands.

 First ever gold medal

See also 
All-time Pan American Games medal table

References

Medal table
Pan American Games medal tables